The South Cairns Cutters Australian Football Club is an Australian rules football and netball club located at Fretwell Park in the southern suburbs of Cairns. The football squad currently plays in the semi-professional AFL Cairns League.

Club history
The club was a foundation member of the league and played in the inaugural season in 1956. South Cairns won the league's first premiership. Due to lack of players in 1963, the club merged with Balaclava to form South Balaclava A.F.C, this team as known as the swans. In 1984 the club became known as South Cairns. The club's colours were red and white. In 1995 the committee voted to change the club's name from Swans to Cutters and the colours to red, white and green.

Home ground
The club's home and training ground was Cazaly's Stadium between 1956 and 1986. In 1987 the club moved to Griffiths Park (SportsWorld).
In 1992 the club secured Fretwell Park as their home ground. Fretwell Park is located on Robert Road in the southern suburb of Bentley Park. In 2012 the kitchen area of the clubhouse was destroyed when it was set on fire by arsonists.

In 2014 the Lou Piccone Pavilion was demolished so the construction of a social club could take place.

Juniors
The club has a very successful junior base and has many play in the regional representative side. The juniors train at Fretwell Park before the seniors on Tuesdays & Thursdays. The club has juniors in the age groups of:
Under 8
Under 9
Under 10
Under 11
Under 13
Under 15
Under 17.5

AFL Players
There is currently only one player from the Cutters to play in the AFL and that is Jarrod Harbrow who currently plays for the Gold Coast Suns.

Honours
 AFL Cairns (9): 1956, 1963, 1964, 1965, 1966, 1968, 1971, 1972, 2003

References

External links
Official site

Sport in Cairns
Australian rules football clubs in Queensland
Australian rules football clubs established in 1956
1956 establishments in Australia